The 1989 NCAA Division I-AA football season, part of college football in the United States organized by the National Collegiate Athletic Association at the Division I-AA level, began in August 1989, and concluded with the 1989 NCAA Division I-AA Football Championship Game on December 16, 1989, at Paulson Stadium in Statesboro, Georgia.

Conference changes and new programs

Conference standings

Conference champions

Postseason
The top four teams were seeded, and thus assured of home games in the opening round. The location of the final, the Georgia Southern Eagles' Paulson Stadium, had been predetermined via a three-year agreement the university reached with the NCAA in February 1989.

NCAA Division I-AA playoff bracket

* Denotes host institution

Source:

References